Pakostov is a village and municipality in Humenné District in the Prešov Region of north-east Slovakia.

History
In historical records the village was first mentioned in 1567.

Geography
The municipality lies at an altitude of 206 metres and covers an area of 14.37 km².
It has a population of about 488 people.

References

External links
 
https://web.archive.org/web/20071217080336/http://www.statistics.sk/mosmis/eng/run.html

Villages and municipalities in Humenné District